Uğur Işıkal (born 15 April 1985) is a Turkish professional footballer who plays as a forward for Sancaktepe. He is the son of Mehmet Işıkal, defender of legendary squad of Göztepe.

Career
He appeared in fifteen Süper Lig matches during the 2007–08 and 2008-09 seasons with İstanbul B.B.

References

External links

1985 births
People from Karşıyaka
Living people
Turkish footballers
Turkey youth international footballers
Association football forwards
Karşıyaka S.K. footballers
İstanbul Başakşehir F.K. players
Boluspor footballers
Göztepe S.K. footballers
Gaziantep F.K. footballers
Giresunspor footballers
Eyüpspor footballers
Pendikspor footballers
Tepecikspor footballers
Süper Lig players
TFF First League players
TFF Second League players
TFF Third League players